The men's 30 kilometre pursuit (15 km classical + 15 km freestyle) at the FIS Nordic World Ski Championships 2005 took place on 20 February 2005 at Oberstdorf, Germany. 

Vincent Vittoz of France won the race and became World Champion for the first time.

Results

References

External links
Final results International Ski Federation (FIS)

FIS Nordic World Ski Championships 2005